aka Time Slip, is a 1979 Japanese science fiction/action film focusing on the adventures of a modern-day Japan Ground Self-Defense Force (JGSDF) and Japan Maritime Self-Defense Force (JMSDF) team that accidentally travels in time to the . The film stars Sonny Chiba, one of the top male Japanese actors, and was based on a novel by Ryo Hanmura, a well-known writer of historical novels and science fiction. A remake was theatrically released in Japan in 2005 under the title Samurai Commando: Mission 1549.

Plot
During a defensive exercise, a wildly mixed group of Japanese SDF forces with a tank, an APC, a patrol boat and a helicopter suddenly find themselves stranded 400 years in the past through a sudden time slip effect and under attack by samurai forces. Their acting commanding officer, Second Lieutenant Yoshiaki Iba, befriends and joins forces with Nagao Kagetora, the war leader of lord Koizumi. Seeing the SDF weaponry in action, Kagetora persuades Iba to aid him in his struggle for supremacy in feudal Japan.

In the meantime, however, Iba finds himself faced with the desperation of his men who want to return to their own time. Some make contact with the locals – one, Private First Class Mimura, even finds himself a consort who keeps following him – whilst others freak out, running away in a desperate attempt to return home, or rebelling against rules and restrictions and try to live as pirates. Finally, his force shrunk from 21 men to 11, Iba manages to calm his troops by telling them that by fighting history and thus creating a time paradox they might be able to return home. Iba joins Kagetora and fights by his side.

Finally, Iba and the members face Takeda Shingen's forces in battle. But their trust in their advanced weaponry costs them dearly: Shingen's forces outmanoeuvre them at every turn, the soldiers lose all their vehicles and major weapons, and five of them die on the battlefield. In a desperate attempt, Iba forces his way to Shingen's command post and kills him in a sword duel.

As Iba and his remaining men go to join Kagetora in Kyoto, the latter is put under pressure by his family and the Shōgun Ashikaga Yoshiaki to get rid of Iba. Reluctantly conceding, Kagetora intercepts Iba's group at an old temple. But as Iba prepares to kill Kagetora for his betrayal, Kagetora shoots him. The other soldiers are killed by Kagetora's archers, and Mimura's consort delivers the fatal blow to her lover.

Kagetora remorsefully buries Iba and his men with honors. In the end, only one of the members, Private Mokichi Nemoto, survives, who had left the group to help a boy and his family, whose father had been killed.

Cast

Shōwa period characters
Commissioned Officers
 Sonny Chiba as Second Lieutenant Yoshiaki Iba (Commanding Officer of the brigade)
 Kazunaga Tsuji as Ensign Shōichirō Ono (Commanding Officer of the patrol boat)
Non-Commissioned Officers and Enlisted Personnel
 Raita Ryū as Sergeant Haruhisa Kimura
 Shinichiro Mikami as Sergeant Goichi Shimada
 Tadashi Kato as Sergeant First Class Hideo Shimizu (Pilot-In-Command of the helicopter)
 Tsunehiko Watase as Leading Private Hayato Yano
 Hiroshi Kamayatsu as Private Mokichi Nemoto
 Jinya Sato as Private Osamu Seki
 Kokontei Shinkoma as Private Kenji Hori
 Jun Eto as Private First Class Nobuhiko Ken
 Yoichi Miura as Private First Class Manabu Nonaka
 Akira Nishikino as Private First Class Koji Kikuchi
 Hiromitsu Suzuki as Private First Class Gō Nishizawa
 Koji Naka as Private First Class Taisuke Mimura
 Ryo Hayami as Private First Class Kazumichi Morishita
 Takuzo Kadono as Seaman Toshishige Suga
 Isao Kuraishi as Private First Class Masao Maruoka
 Kenzo Kawarazaki as Private First Class Koji Kano
 Ken Takahashi as Private First Class Masayoshi Hirai
 Akihiro Shimizu as Private First Class Satoshi Ōnishi
 Toshitaka Ito as Seaman Harumi Takashima
 Nana Okada as Kazuko Arai
 Hiroshi Katsuno as Track Coach

Sengoku period characters
 Isao Natsuyagi as Nagao Kagetora
 Haruki Kadokawa as Sanada Masayuki
 Hitoshi Omae as Kuribayashi Magoichi
 Kentaro Kudo as Ishiba Takehide
 Katsumasa Uchida as Asaba Yorichika
 Goro Kataoka as Tategawa Katsuzō
 Asao Koike as Koizumi Yukinaga
 Shin Kishida as Naoe Bungo
 Hirohisa Nakata as Kuroda Naoharu
 Hiroshi Tanaka as Takeda Shingen
 Hiroyuki Sanada as Takeda Katsuyori
 Hiroko Yakushimaru as Young Takeda Samurai
 Gajiro Sato as Foot Soldier
 Mikio Narita as Kōsa
 Mizuho Suzuki as Shōgun Ashikaga Yoshiaki
 Masashi Ishibashi as Hosokawa Fujitaka
 Miyuki Ono as Miwa
 Masao Kusakari as Masakichi
 Ryudo Uzaki as Ochimusha
 Ayako Honma as Old Woman
 Koji Iizuka as Shokichi
 Maiko Ōtsuka as Mai
 Kaori Taniguchi as Shokichi & Mai's Mother
 Noboru Nakaya as Yoshitaka Kujo
 Moeko Ezawa as Widow Yui

Equipment

Initially, the producers approached the Japan Ground Self-Defense Force (JGSDF) for props and vehicles, but the army cut their support after reading that the soldiers went AWOL in the script. For that reason, old and sometimes out-dated equipment (like M3 submachine guns) had to be used. The tank featured in the movie was even built entirely from scratch.

The vehicles, including a tank and a helicopter, continue to run despite there being no replenishing fuel supply in the 16th century – a logical problem which was resolved in the remake.

Adaptations
A film remake in 2005 was titled Sengoku Jieitai 1549.
A four-episode TV miniseries called Sengoku Jieitai: Sekigahara no Tatakai was aired in 2006 by NTV, directed by Kōsei Saitō.

Name of the movie in different languages
Japanese: Sengoku Jieitai
English: G.I. Samurai
French: Les Guerriers de l'Apocalypse
Spanish: Eclipse En El Tiempo
Croatian: Vrijeme je stalo u 5 i 18
German: Time Slip – Tag der Apokalypse
Norwegian: Tidsstorm
Russian: Провал во времени
Cantonese: Zin3 Gwok3 Zi6 Wai6 Deoi6

Home video
In the UK, the film was bundled with Golgo 13: Assignment Kowloon and The Bullet Train in The Sonny Chiba Collection Vol. 2 Region 2 DVD set by Optimum Home Releasing.

In popular culture
The film is indirectly referenced in the Japanese light novel series Gate as research material for JSDF countermeasures against the Special Region's Imperial forces, and fire rams and ambush trenches (both of which appear during the battle against Shingen's forces in the film) are made use of by Zorzal's forces during the later Imperial civil war.

See also
The Final Countdown (film)
Axis of Time
Zipang (anime)
Red Shift (novel)
The Guns of the South
Heaven's Soldiers
Rome, Sweet Rome
Gate: Jieitai Kano Chi nite, Kaku Tatakaeri

References

戦国自衛隊・非公式サイト

External links

Films about time travel
Toho films
1979 films
Sengoku period in fiction
Japanese science fiction action films
Films set in the 16th century
Japan Self-Defense Forces in fiction
Films scored by Kentarō Haneda
1970s Japanese films